Qanat Kalantar (also Romanized as Qanāt Kalāntar and Qanāt-e Kalāntar) is a village in Mohammadabad Rural District, in the Central District of Anbarabad County, Kerman Province, Iran. At the 2006 census, its population was 312, in 70 families.

References 

Populated places in Anbarabad County